"Oh, Pretty Woman" or simply "Pretty Woman" is a song recorded by Roy Orbison, written by Orbison and Bill Dees. It was released as a single in August 1964 on Monument Records and spent three weeks at number one on the Billboard Hot 100 from September 26, 1964, the second and final single by Orbison to top the US charts. It was also Orbison's third single to top the UK Singles Chart (for a total of three weeks).

The single version (in mono) and the LP version (in stereo on the Oribisongs LP) have slightly differing lyrics. The LP version with the intended lyric: "come with me baby" was changed for the single to "come to me baby" as the former was considered too risque. The record ultimately sold seven million copies and marked the high point in Orbison's career. Within months of its release, in October 1964, the single was certified gold by the RIAA. At the year's end, Billboard ranked it the number four song of 1964.

"Oh, Pretty Woman" was later used for the title of the 1990 film Pretty Woman starring Richard Gere and Julia Roberts, and the 2018 Broadway musical Pretty Woman: The Musical.

Overview
The title was inspired by Orbison's wife, Claudette, interrupting a conversation to announce she was going out. When Orbison asked if she had enough cash, his co-writer Bill Dees interjected, "A pretty woman never needs any money."

Orbison's recording of the song was produced by Fred Foster on August 1, 1964. There were four guitar players at the session: Roy Orbison, Billy Sanford, Jerry Kennedy, and Wayne Moss. Sanford, who later played on sessions for Elvis Presley, Don Williams and many others, played the intro guitar.  Other musicians on the record included Floyd Cramer on piano, Henry Strzelecki on upright bass, Boots Randolph and Charlie McCoy on saxophones, Buddy Harman on drums, and Paul Garrison on percussion. Co-writer Bill Dees sung high harmony, as he did on many Orbison songs. Bill Porter served as recording engineer.  Billboard described the song as having a "great dance beat coupled with fine arrangement."  Cash Box described it as "a catchy, quick-beat salute with a number of ear-catching rockin' ingredients."

Orbison posthumously won the 1991 Grammy Award for Best Male Pop Vocal Performance for his live recording of "Oh Pretty Woman" on his HBO television special Roy Orbison and Friends, A Black and White Night. In 1999, the song was honored with a Grammy Hall of Fame Award and was named one of the Rock and Roll Hall of Fame's 500 Songs that Shaped Rock and Roll. In 2004, Rolling Stone magazine ranked it number 224 on their list of the "500 Greatest Songs of All Time." On May 14, 2008, The Library of Congress selected the song for preservation in the National Recording Registry.

Copyright issue

In 1989, rap group 2 Live Crew recorded a parody of the Orbison song, using the alternate title "Pretty Woman", for their album As Clean as They Wanna Be. 2 Live Crew sampled the distinctive bassline from the Orbison song, but replaced the original lyrics with talk about a hairy woman and her bald-headed friend and their appeal to the singer, as well as denunciation of a "two-timing woman."

Orbison's publisher, Acuff-Rose Music sued 2 Live Crew on the basis that the fair use doctrine did not permit reuse of their copyrighted material for profit. The case, Campbell v. Acuff-Rose Music, Inc. went all the way to the United States Supreme Court. The Supreme Court decided in 2 Live Crew's favor, greatly expanding the doctrine of fair use and extending its protections to parodies created for profit. It is considered a seminal fair use decision.

Charts

Weekly charts

Year-end charts

Certifications

Van Halen version

Van Halen recorded the song as a stand-alone (non-album) single, before a planned hiatus. However, its sudden success brought much pressure from Warner Bros to quickly produce an entire LP, the result being their 1982 LP Diver Down.

"Oh, Pretty Woman" was preceded by a 1-minute, 40-second intro, entitled "Intruder", which featured David Lee Roth playing a very simple riff on a small plastic, Electroharmonix keyboard.

Music video

For the video of the single, "Intruder" and "(Oh) Pretty Woman" were joined to accommodate the video's full running time. David Lee Roth wrote Intruder because the video they had made was too long for the running-time of "(Oh) Pretty Woman."
In the music video, filmed at Indian Dunes, the band members dress as a samurai (bassist Michael Anthony), Tarzan (drummer Alex Van Halen), a cowboy (guitarist Eddie Van Halen), and Napoleon (frontman David Lee Roth). Per a hunch-backed onlooker's request, they rescue a captive girl. It was one of the first videos banned by MTV, due to its opening sequence. The captive girl (in reality, a Los Angeles drag queen) is tied up and fondled against her will by a pair of dwarves. The ban was eventually lifted, as MTV sister network VH1 Classic (now MTV Classic) would later air the video.

Charts
"Oh, Pretty Woman" was Van Halen's second Top 20 hit, peaking at number 12 on the Billboard Hot 100, and also peaking at number one on the Billboard Mainstream Rock chart.

See also
List of Billboard Mainstream Rock number-one songs of the 1980s

References

Further reading

1964 songs
1964 singles
1976 singles
1982 singles
Roy Orbison songs
Van Halen songs
Songs written by Roy Orbison
Songs written by Bill Dees
Song recordings produced by Fred Foster
Billboard Hot 100 number-one singles
Cashbox number-one singles
UK Singles Chart number-one singles
RPM Top Singles number-one singles
Number-one singles in Germany
Number-one singles in Norway
Irish Singles Chart number-one singles
Grammy Hall of Fame Award recipients
Grammy Award for Best Male Pop Vocal Performance
United States National Recording Registry recordings
Monument Records singles
Warner Records singles